Below is a partial list of current ambassadors from Angola to other nations:

: Miguel Maria N'Zau Puna
: Hendrick Vaal Neto
: Jose Joao Manuel
: Brito Sozinho
: Lizeth Nawanga Satumbo Pena
: Toko Diakenga Serão
: Domingos Culolo
: Ana Maria Teles Carreira
: Ismael Abraão Gaspar Martins
: Joaquim do Espirito Santo

References

Angola diplomacy-related lists
Angola
Main
Ambassadors